Skip Bandini is a former American football coach. He served as the head football coach at Curry College in Milton, Massachusetts from 2006 to 2021. Bandini was the defensive coordinator and then offensive coordinator at Curry under Steve Nelson before succeeding him as head coach.

In 1992, Bandini was appointed head football coach at Don Bosco Technical High School in Boston.

Head coaching record

References

External links
 Curry profile

Living people
American football offensive linemen
Curry Colonels football coaches
Massachusetts Maritime Buccaneers football coaches
Massachusetts Maritime Buccaneers football players
MIT Engineers football coaches
Mount Ida Mustangs football coaches
UMass Lowell River Hawks football coaches
High school football coaches in Massachusetts
Players of American football from Boston
Year of birth missing (living people)